Mansour Amirasefi (July 7, 1933 – March 6, 2010) was an Iranian football player and manager. He played for Kian F.C. and also captained Team Melli. He became manager of Persepolis F.C. in 1977. In a match, he didn't put Ali Parvin in the line-up, Parvin protested and then Amirasefi resigned from the club. He was also manager of F.C. Ararat Tehran. He was born in Tehran, Iran.

External links 
 "Former Persepolis coach Amirasefi dies at 77"
 
 
 

1933 births
2010 deaths
Iranian footballers
Iran international footballers
Persepolis F.C. managers
Footballers at the 1964 Summer Olympics
Olympic footballers of Iran
Iranian football managers
Association football forwards